The Kuparuk River (Iñupiaq: Kuukpaaġruk) is a river in Alaska's North Slope that enters a bay on the Beaufort Sea between Beechey Point and Prudhoe Bay. Its Eskimo name appeared on a map drawn in 1901 by a prospector who spelled it Koopowra, which he translated as Big River. Kuukpaaġruk can be translated to a "smaller version of a big river". 

Arctic explorer Ernest de Koven Leffingwell named the mound, which he used as a triangulation station in 1911.

See also
List of rivers of Alaska

References

Rivers of North Slope Borough, Alaska
Rivers of Alaska